Sangre Grande is the largest town in northeastern Trinidad and Tobago. It is located east of Arima and southwest of the village of Toco. It is the seat of the Sangre Grande Regional Corporation and capital of the region.

Overview and history 

The name Sangre Grande means "big blood", and it has been suggested that the town was named for a battle that took place between the native Amerindians and the Spanish settlers.  However, this interpretation is not supported by historical records.  The true origin of the name refers to when, in the late 1770s, Spanish surveyors who were charting the island for the purposes of creating a map, found that the waters of two of the tributaries of the nearby Oropouche River were red as blood, hence the name.

Similarly, the neighbouring town is called Sangre Chiquito ("small blood") is named for the presence of a smaller, similarly colored river in that town.  Sangre Grande grew as a result of the growth of cacao cultivation in the late nineteenth century.  It grew further when it became the terminus of the railroad. Construction of the railroad caused the town to migrate down the hill to meet the railroad.  When the town relocated to the foot of the hill, the name Sangre Grande moved with it.  As a result, the name of the pre-existing village, Cunapo, was largely, but not entirely, lost.

Climate
Sangre Grande has a tropical rainforest climate according to the Köppen climate classification, characterized by high temperatures and rainfall. Temperatures climb to a maximum of around 30 °C throughout the year, hovering at a low of around 23 °C at night in Summer and 19 °C in winter. Temperatures outside of the immediate town center are usually around 2-3 °C lower due to abundant moisture and cloud clover of the lush surrounding forest.  Rainfall is heavy all year, but especially so June through December, peaking in November at 342mm, and being at its driest in March with 88mm.<ref>, Climate Sangre Grande, Cli>

Infrastructure
Sangre Grande is more developed than its surrounding areas. Many residents from surrounding areas depend on Sangre Grande for Government facilities as well as for shopping. Many residents in surrounding villages also come to Sangre Grande as a means of getting transportation to larger towns for example Arima and Port of Spain.

Healthcare
Sangre Grande has both a Government hospital (located on Ojoe Road) and a Government Health Clinic.

Transportation 
The Eastern Main Road is the most important road leading into Sangre Grande as the Churchill Roosevelt Highway ends in Wallerfield. The Eastern Main Road connects Sangre Grande to the east to Sangre Chiquito and Manzanilla and to the west to Arima and Port of Spain. The second major road in Toco Road connects Sangre Grande to villages in the northeast, for example Toco and Matelot.

Railroad
The railways in Trinidad closed in the late 20th century, but many traces of the railroad's passage through Sangre Grande still exist. The current Public Transport Service Corporation (PTSC) terminal was formerly the train station. Additionally, tracks leading into Sangre Grande have been converted into roads, although it still bears the name of Railway Road. However, with growing road traffic congestion on the nation's roads, there are plans in to introduce a rapid rail whose first stage of development will stretch from Sangre Grande to Port of Spain.

Bus
Buses still ply the routes in and out of Sangre Grande. The bus terminus in the heart of Sangre Grande was recently upgraded.

Maxi taxi
Maxi taxis as well as traditional taxis service Sangre Grande. The Maxi taxis were first situated in the vicinity of the PTSC bus terminus, however the busyness of this location combined with the growing number of Maxi taxis had exacerbated traffic problems in the area and the old PTSC service station and washing bay on Brierly Street was converted to a maxi taxi hub instead. Here, Maxi taxis heading to both Arima and Port of Spain can be found.

Education
As in the rest of the country, Sangre Grande is home to primary and secondary schools which fall into three categories: Government-run, Government-assisted and private. In Sangre Grande there are 2 private secondary schools and one private primary school.

Primary schools
Government-run primary schools:
Sangre Grande Government Primary School
Guaico Government Primary School
North Oropouche Government Primary School
Government-assisted primary schools:
Cunapo (St. Francis) R.C. School
Sangre Grande Hindu Primary School
Sangre Grande S.D.A. Primary School
Upper Sangre Grande R.C. School
Guaico Presbyterian Primary School
Grosvenor Presbyterian Primary School
North Oropouche R.C. School
Fishing Pond Presbyterian Primary School
Caigual R.C. Primary School
Sangre Chiquito Presbyterian Primary School

Private Primary Schools:
SWAHA Tulsi Manas Primary School

Secondary schools

Government-run secondary schools:
Guaico Secondary School
Northeastern College
Sangre Grande Secondary School

Private secondary schools:
Sangre Grande Educational Institute
Bates Memorial S.D.A. High School

Government-assisted Secondary Schools:
SWAHA Hindu College

Notable persons 
 John Agitation - comedian
 Ravi B - singer
 Isaiah James Boodhoo - painter
 Anisa Mohammed - cricketer
 Michelle Samuel-Foo - scientist
 Cindy Devika Sharma - senator

Sports
Sangre Grande is home to many sports teams that take part in national competition such as the North East Stars football team and the Sangre Grande All Stars basketball team, Team Elite Karate.

Steel orchestras
Sangre Grande is also home to the Sangre Grande Cordettes which has been a mainstay panside in the area for many years. The band often makes the national finals of the Panorama competition, where it currently competes in the medium band category. The band's music used to be arranged by one of the most famous pan arrangers in Trinidad, Jit Samaroo. For the past few years, the band has had a new secret weapon, choosing the wildcard arranger from Denmark, Anders Kappel to carry it  forward into the panorama competition.

Other bands exist in the area, including the Tamana Pioneers (small band category). Several schoolbands in the area also participate in the school panorama competition every year.

References 

 
Populated places in Trinidad and Tobago
Trinidad (island)